Daniel Olmo Carvajal (born 7 May 1998) is a Spanish professional footballer who plays for Bundesliga club RB Leipzig and the Spain national team. He can play as either an attacking midfielder or a winger.

After a period at FC Barcelona, he made his professional debut for Dinamo Zagreb in Croatia in 2015. He made 124 total appearances for the club, scoring 34 goals and winning the league five times and the cup three times. In 2020, he joined RB Leipzig, where he won the DFB-Pokal in 2022.

Olmo won the 2019 UEFA European Championship with the Spain under-21 team, and a silver medal at the 2020 Olympic tournament. He made his senior international debut in 2019 and was part of the team that reached the semi-finals of UEFA Euro 2020.

Club career

Early career
Born in Terrassa, Barcelona, Catalonia, Olmo arrived in FC Barcelona's youth academy aged nine, from neighbours RCD Espanyol.

Dinamo Zagreb
In a surprise move, Olmo joined Dinamo Zagreb on 31 July 2014, aged 16. He made his first team debut against Lokomotiva Zagreb on 7 February 2015, as a 76th-minute substitute for Paulo Machado in a 2–1 home win. On 22 September, he scored his first goal in a 7–1 win at Oštrc Zlatar in the first round of the cup.

On 22 August 2016, Olmo signed a new four-year contract. He scored three goals in four games as the team came runners-up in the cup, including one in the 3–1 loss to Rijeka in the final on 31 May; four days earlier he scored his first league goal in a 5–2 home win over the same team – already champions – on the final day.

Olmo provided Izet Hajrović with an assist for the third goal and scored the fourth in the Europa League 4–1 victory over Fenerbahçe on 20 September 2018. On 17 December, Olmo was named the best player of Prva HNL for 2018. In the same month, he finished 11th in Tuttosport's Golden Boy award, ahead of the likes of Kylian Mbappé and Josip Brekalo. On 14 February 2019, he scored the only goal in a Europa League round of 32 game against Viktoria Plzeň, that ended in a 2–1 loss. On 3 June, he was named the best player and best young player of the 2018–19 Prva HNL season.

On 18 September 2019, he made his Champions League debut in a 4–0 home win over Atalanta. He scored his first goal in the competition on 22 October in a 2–2 away draw with Shakhtar Donetsk. He scored the only Dinamo's goal in a 1–4 home defeat to Manchester City on 11 December, as Dinamo finished at the bottom of the group.

RB Leipzig

On 25 January 2020, Olmo moved to Bundesliga club RB Leipzig, signing a four-year contract. He made his debut a week later, in a 2–2 draw with Borussia Mönchengladbach coming on for Tyler Adams in 69th minute. On 4 February he scored the only goal in a 3–1 DFB-Pokal defeat to Eintracht Frankfurt, having come on for Amadou Haidara at half time. 

Olmo made his first start for Leipzig on 9 February 2020, in a game against Bayern Munich that ended as a goalless draw, coming off for Patrik Schick in the 69th minute. On 12 June, he scored both goals in a 2–0 victory over 1899 Hoffenheim. On 13 August, he scored the opening goal in a 2–1 victory over Atlético Madrid at Estádio José Alvalade, as Leipzig progressed to the Champions League semi-final for the first time in the history of the club.

Olmo played four games in RB Leipzig's victory in the DFB-Pokal in 2021–22, scoring to conclude a 2–0 home win over Hansa Rostock in the last 16 on 19 January. He was a 69th-minute substitute for Kevin Kampl in the final on 21 May, and scored in the penalty shootout win after a 1–1 draw with SC Freiburg; with two minutes of extra time remaining, he was tackled in the penalty area by Nicolas Höfler and Kampl was sent off from the substitutes' bench for demanding a penalty kick. On 30 July, again on for Kampl, he scored a consolation goal in a 5–3 loss to Bayern Munich in the 2022 DFL-Supercup.

International career

Youth teams 
Olmo was part of the Spanish squad at the 2015 European Under-17 Championship in Bulgaria; he netted in the penalty shoot-out as they were eliminated by Germany in the quarter-finals, but then had his attempt saved by Will Huffer as Spain lost to England by the same means in a play-off for that year's World Cup for the category. Towards the end of 2017, Dinamo Zagreb director Tomislav Svetina said that the club was doing all it could to get the teenager Croatian citizenship. Olmo himself showed a desire to switch to Croatia at the international level. However, in October 2018, he made his debut for the Spain U21 side.

Olmo was part of Spain's squad that won the 2019 UEFA European Under-21 Championship in Italy and San Marino, playing four matches, assisting one goal and scoring three, including one in the final which caused him to be named Man of the Match.

Senior team 
Olmo earned his first senior team call-up in November 2019, for Euro 2020 qualifiers against Malta and Romania, after Spain had already qualified for the tournament. He debuted on 15 November as a substitute for Álvaro Morata in the 66th minute and scored three minutes later in the 7–0 home victory over Malta. Fellow debutant Pau Torres also scored, making it the first time that two Spaniards scored on their first cap in 30 years.

On 24 May 2021, Olmo was included in Luis Enrique's 24-man squad for the UEFA Euro 2020. On 28 June, in the extra time of the round of 16 fixture against Croatia, he provided Morata and Mikel Oyarzabal with assists to set the score at 4–3 and 5–3 respectively. On 2 July, after the quarter-final 1–1 draw with Switzerland went to a penalty shoot-out, Olmo successfully converted his as Spain won 3–1. On 6 July, in the semi-final fixture against Italy, he provided Morata with an assist for an equalizer; however, another 1–1 draw went to another shoot-out with Olmo missing his penalty and Italy winning 4–2.

Olmo was included in Luis de la Fuente's 22-man squad for the 2020 Summer Olympics, on 29 June 2021. On Spain's road to Olympic silver, Olmo contributed an assist in the 1–1 draw with Argentina, and a goal and an assist in the 5–2 victory over Ivory Coast. He was named a starter in the final that Spain lost 2–1 to Brazil.

Personal life
Olmo's father, Miquel, is a retired footballer. As a forward, he played professionally for lower-league teams. Dani's older brother Carlos is also a footballer and plays as a defender; he spent several years in Croatia, for Dinamo's reserves and also for Lokomotiva Zagreb. Olmo speaks Croatian fluently.

Career statistics

Club

International

Scores and results list Spain's goal tally first.

Honours
Dinamo Zagreb
Prva HNL: 2014–15, 2015–16, 2017–18, 2018–19, 2019–20
Croatian Cup: 2014–15, 2015–16, 2017–18
Croatian Super Cup: 2019

RB Leipzig
 DFB-Pokal: 2021–22
Spain U21
UEFA European Under-21 Championship: 2019

Spain U23
Summer Olympics silver medal: 2020
Individual
UEFA European Under-21 Championship Team of the Tournament: 2019
UEFA Champions League Breakthrough XI: 2019
Prva HNL Player of the Year: 2018
Trophy Footballer – Best Prva HNL player: 2019
Trophy Footballer – Best Prva HNL U-21 player: 2019
Trophy Footballer – Prva HNL Team of the Year: 2019
GNK Dinamo Zagreb Player of the Year: 2019
SIMPOSAR International Sports Symposium – Discovery of the Year: 2019

References

External links

 Profile at the RB Leipzig website
 
 
 

1998 births
Living people
Footballers from Terrassa
Spanish footballers
Association football wingers
GNK Dinamo Zagreb II players
GNK Dinamo Zagreb players
RB Leipzig players
Croatian Football League players
First Football League (Croatia) players
Bundesliga players
Spain youth international footballers
Spain under-21 international footballers
Spain international footballers
UEFA Euro 2020 players
2022 FIFA World Cup players
Spanish expatriate footballers
Spanish expatriate sportspeople in Croatia
Expatriate footballers in Croatia
Spanish expatriate sportspeople in Germany
Expatriate footballers in Germany
Olympic footballers of Spain
Footballers at the 2020 Summer Olympics
Olympic medalists in football
Olympic silver medalists for Spain
Medalists at the 2020 Summer Olympics